Jorge Luiz Alves Justino or simply Jorge Luiz (born April 22, 1982 in Rio de Janeiro), is a Brazilian central defender who currently plays for Tombense.

Career 
On 23 January 2009 the defender left F.C. Paços de Ferreira in Portugal, signing for them just two days ago. The player has moved to South Korean team Suwon Samsung Bluewings and signed a one-year contract. The Portuguese team are likely to sue the player.

References

External links

globoesporte.globo.com 
netvasco.com.br 
 

1982 births
Living people
Brazilian footballers
Brazilian expatriate footballers
Friburguense Atlético Clube players
Associação Desportiva Confiança players
America Football Club (RJ) players
Sport Club Internacional players
CR Vasco da Gama players
Suwon Samsung Bluewings players
Clube Atlético Mineiro players
Ceará Sporting Club players
Guaratinguetá Futebol players
Villa Rio Esporte Clube players
Associação Desportiva São Caetano players
Vitória F.C. players
Guarani FC players
K League 1 players
Primeira Liga players
Brazilian expatriate sportspeople in South Korea
Expatriate footballers in South Korea
Brazilian expatriate sportspeople in Portugal
Expatriate footballers in Portugal
Association football defenders
Footballers from Rio de Janeiro (city)